Dominique Vivant, Baron Denon (4 January 1747 – 27 April 1825) was a French artist, writer, diplomat, author, and archaeologist. Denon was a diplomat for France under Louis XV and Louis XVI. He was appointed as the first Director of the Louvre museum by Napoleon after the Egyptian campaign of 1798–1801, and is commemorated in the Denon Wing of the modern museum and in the Dominique-Vivant Denon Research Center.  His two-volume Voyage dans la basse et la haute Egypte ("Journey in Lower and Upper Egypt"), 1802, was foundational for modern Egyptology.

Birth and name

Vivant Denon was born in Givry, near Chalon-sur-Saône to a family called "de Non", of the "petite noblesse" or gentry, and until the French Revolution signed himself as  "le chevalier de Non".  Like many of the nobility, he revised his surname at the Revolution to lose the "nobiliary particle" "de".  He seems to have consistently avoided using his baptised first name "Dominique", preferring his middle name "Vivant", and so is usually known as "Vivant Denon".  He was created "Baron Denon" by Napoleon in August 1812, at the age of 65.

Early life
He was sent to Paris to study law, but he showed a decided preference for art and literature, and soon gave up his profession. In his twenty-third year he produced a comedy, Le Bon Pére, which obtained a succès d'estime, as he had already won a position in society by his agreeable manners and exceptional conversational powers. He became a favorite of Louis XV, who entrusted him with the collection and arrangement of a cabinet of medals and antique gems for Madame de Pompadour, and subsequently appointed him attaché to the French embassy at St. Petersburg.

Diplomatic career

On the accession of Louis XVI, Denon was transferred to Sweden; but he returned, after a brief interval, to Paris with the ambassador M. de Vergennes, who had been appointed foreign minister. In 1775 Denon was sent on a secret mission to Switzerland, and took the opportunity of visiting Voltaire at Ferney. He made a portrait of the philosopher, which was engraved and published on his return to Paris. His next diplomatic appointment was to Naples, where he spent seven years, first as secretary to the embassy and afterwards as chargé d'affaires. He devoted this period to a careful study of the monuments of ancient art, collecting many specimens and making drawings of others. He also perfected himself in etching and mezzotinto engraving. While in Naples he met Sir William and Lady Hamilton and he etched Lady Hamilton 'posing'.

The death of his patron, M. de Vergennes, in 1787, led to his recall, and the rest of his life was given mainly to artistic pursuits. On his return to Paris he was admitted a member of the Académie royale de peinture et de sculpture (1787). After a brief interval he returned to Italy, living chiefly at Venice. He also visited Florence and Bologna, and afterwards went to Switzerland. While there he heard that his property had been confiscated, and his name placed on the list of the proscribed, and with characteristic courage he resolved at once to return to Paris: his situation was critical, but he was spared, thanks to the friendship of the painter David, who obtained for him a commission to furnish designs for republican costumes. When the Revolution was over, Denon was one of the bands of eminent men who frequented the house of Madame de Beauharnais. Here he met Bonaparte, to whose fortunes he wisely attached himself.

Egypt and the Louvre

At Bonaparte's invitation he joined the expedition to Egypt as part of the arts and literature section of the Institut d'Égypte, and thus found the opportunity of gathering the materials for his most important literary and artistic work. He accompanied General Desaix to Upper Egypt, and made numerous sketches of the monuments of ancient art, sometimes under the very fire of the enemy. The results were published in his Voyage dans la basse et la haute Egypte (Journey in Lower and Upper Egypt), published as two volumes in 1802.  The work crowned his reputation both as an archaeologist and as an artist, and sparked the Egyptian Revival in architecture and decorative arts. (See: Egyptian Revival architecture and Egyptian revival decorative arts)

On 19 November 1802, he was appointed by Napoleon to the important office of director-general of museums and head of the new Musée Napoléon, which he filled until the Allied occupation of Paris in 1814, when he had to retire. He was a devoted servant of Napoleon, on whose behalf he personally looted vast numbers of works of art in Italy, the Low Countries and Germany and, through agents (including Goya), in Spain, for the Musee Napoleon in Paris. Many of these remain in the Louvre, and elsewhere in France, today. In particular, Denon was one of the first men to appreciate the importance of the Italian 'primitives'. The majority of those now in the Louvre were looted by Denon during a sweep he made through Italy in 1812. They were publicly paraded, with elephants 
and other wild animals, like a Roman triumph, through the streets of Paris, before being deposited in the Louvre.

Denon took full opportunity, while working for Napoleon, to assemble for himself an enormous collection of paintings, drawings, prints, books, statuary and objets d'art. This collection was sold at auction over several days after Denon's death. In 1810 he also assisted the Hermitage Museum in its acquisition of Rosso Fiorentino's Madonna and Child with Cherubs in Paris.

Retirement and death

At the Bourbon Restoration of 1814 Denon was confirmed in place for a year, but was too closely associated with the former regime to keep the position for long, and was replaced by Auguste de Forbin in 1816.  After his forced retirement he began an illustrated history of ancient and modern art, in which he had the cooperation of several skillful engravers. He died at Paris in 1825, leaving the work unfinished. It was published posthumously, with an explanatory text by Amaury Duval, under the title Monuments des arts du dessin chez les peuples tant anciens que modernes, recueillis par Vivant Denon in 1829. Denon was also the author of an erotic novel, Point de lendemain, published in 1777 (in 1812 as a separate work), and of a number of erotic etchings.

He died in Paris and is buried in the world famous Père Lachaise Cemetery, where his grave is marked by a life-sized statue.

Legacy

In Napoleon III's Louvre expansion in the 1850s, Denon's name was given to the central pavillon of the Nouveau Louvre's South Wing. In the Grand Louvre project of the late 1980s, the entire South Wing of the Louvre was named after him (aile Denon, echoing Richelieu to the North and Sully to the East) as part of a signposting concept developed by the Carbone Smolan Agency.

Works
 
 
 
  A note at the beginning of this book states 'Point De Lendemain, the authorship of which has also been attributed to Vivant Denon was first published in 1777'. Hence the authorship being stated as Dorat in Sutton's translation.

In fiction
Anthony O'Neill included the character of Vivant Denon in his novel The Empire of Eternity, in which he is portrayed as bisexual.

Lee Langley has written a biographical novel of Denon's life, A conversation on the Quai Voltaire.

Ruth McKenney also includes the character of Vivant Denon in her novel Mirage.

Milan Kundera's Slowness (1995) includes a rewriting of Vivant-Denon's Point de lendemain.

References and sources

External links

 The Louvre Dominique-Vivant Denon Research Centre

1747 births
1825 deaths
People from Saône-et-Loire
French archaeologists
French Egyptologists
Barons of France
Burials at Père Lachaise Cemetery
Directors of the Louvre
Commission des Sciences et des Arts members
Members of the Académie des beaux-arts